Prek Toal is a bird sanctuary and Ramsar site located within the Tonlé Sap Biosphere Reserve, at the north-west corner of the Tonlé Sap. It is a popular area for ecotourism and birdwatching given the area's rich biodiversity and rare waterbirds, particularly abundant during the dry season.

References

External links
 Cambodia's Ministry of Tourism's webpage about the park
 Lonely Planet's webpage about the park

Geography of Battambang province
Nature reserves in Cambodia
Bird sanctuaries
Tourist attractions in Battambang province
Ramsar sites in Cambodia